Mazovo is a village in Vyshnevolotsky District of Tver Oblast, Russia.

References

Rural localities in Vyshnevolotsky District
Vyshnevolotsky Uyezd